Stefan Prisadov (born October 13, 1990 in Smolyan, Bulgaria) is an alpine skier from Bulgaria. He competed for Bulgaria at the 2014 Winter Olympics in the slalom and giant slalom.

References 

1990 births
Living people
Bulgarian male alpine skiers
Olympic alpine skiers of Bulgaria
Alpine skiers at the 2014 Winter Olympics
People from Smolyan
Competitors at the 2017 Winter Universiade